Brusovo is a settlement in Udomelsky District of Tver Oblast, Russia.

On June 1, 1936 Brusovsky District with the administrative center in Brusovo was established as a part of Kalinin Oblast. On November 14, 1960 it was abolished and split between Maksatikhinsky and Udomelsky Districts. Brusovo was transferred to Udomelsky District.

References

Rural localities in Udomelsky District
Vyshnevolotsky Uyezd